Frank D. Weir (December 16, 1863 - August 11, 1923) was an American trainer of Thoroughbred racehorses best known as the trainer of U.S. Racing Hall of Fame inductee Roseben and the trainer of another Hall of Fame inductee Old Rosebud with whom he won the 1914 Kentucky Derby as well as the winning trainer of the 1918 Preakness Stakes with Jack Hare Jr. 

Weir began his career as a trainer in 1884 and in 1893 won 150 races. Success led to a move in 1903 to New York to compete at the big tracks at Sheepshead Bay, Gravesend, Brighton Beach, Aqueduct, Jamaica and Saratoga. There, between 1903 and 1907 he won 217 races and earned $294,957 (adjusted for inflation: $8,212,083 in 2019).

References

1863 births
1923 deaths
American horse trainers
People from Kane County, Illinois